Tristão de Alencar, later Araripe, (October 7, 1821, Ceará – July 3, 1908, Rio de Janeiro) was a Brazilian judge and government minister. He is the Grandson of Bárbara de Alencar, an important revolutionary leader during the revolutionary movements of 1817. He served as Minister of Finance in 1891.

One of his sons was the writer Araripe Júnior (1848-1911).

References

1821 births
1908 deaths
Finance Ministers of Brazil